The 1970 Cardiff City Council election was held on Thursday 7 May 1970 to elect councillors to Cardiff City Council in Cardiff, Glamorgan, Wales. It took place on the same day as many other local elections in Wales and England.

The previous elections to this one were in May 1969 and the next elections would be in May 1971. These would be some of the last all-Cardiff elections before the dissolution of the unitary authority and the creation of the new second-tier district authority of Cardiff City Council in 1974.

The election saw the Labour Party taking seats from the Conservatives.

Background
Cardiff County Borough Council had been created in 1889. Cardiff became a city in 1905. Elections to the local authority were held annually, though not all council seats were included in each contest, because each of the three councillors in each ward stood down for election in rotation. The councillors elected in 1970 would be the last to serve a full three year term in office. Nineteen seats in 19 electoral wards were up for election in May 1970.

Overview of the result

The Labour Party recovered the position they had been in prior to the 1967 election, gaining three seats from the Conservatives. This was credited to the fact Labour's supporters had come out to vote, rather than staying home as they had done at the last election. The campaign against the new hook road in the north of the city was a factor. Two wards where Labour made gains, Cathays and Central, were directly affected. Bill Herbert, who won in the Central ward, was chairman of the Cardiff United Residents Association and a leading campaigner against the new road.

The most prominent casualty of the election was Councillor Mary Hallinan, the Lady Mayoress, who lost her seat in the Central ward.  The morning after the election, the Lord Mayor of Cardiff, Alderman Lincoln Hallinan, broke an 18 year tradition when he refused to welcome the three newly elected (Labour) councillors, Herbert, Matthewson and Edwards, in his parlour. He later agreed to meet them before the first council meeting the following week.

Despite winning their first seat on the council in 1969, and fielding a large number of candidates at the 1970 election, Plaid Cymru performed poorly, though managed to come second in Llandaff.

Council composition
Following the May 1970 election the balance on the city council was 57 Conservatives, 18 Labour and one Plaid Cymru.

Ward results
Contests took place in every ward at this election.

Adamsdown

Canton

Cathays

Central

Ely

Gabalfa

Grangetown

Bernard Matthewson, a former city councillor, won after a recount.

Llanishen

Llandaff

Penylan

This was claimed to be the first ever all-woman ward election in Cardiff.

Plasmawr

Plasnewydd

Rhiwbina

Riverside

Roath

Rumney

South

Splott

Whitchurch

* = 'retiring' ward councillor for re-election

References

Cardiff
Council elections in Cardiff
1970s in Cardiff